Pike & Rose is a mixed-use development in the form of an ersatz downtown in North Bethesda, Maryland, a block away from North Bethesda station of the Washington metro. Its first phase opened in 2014. Pike & Rose now comprises  of retail, 864 residential units, a 177-room hotel, and just under  of class-A office space. Retail anchors include REI, West Elm, and Uniqlo. Amp by Strathmore, a 200-seat music venue, is adjacent to an iPic movie theater. There is a Porsche auto dealership.

Montgomery County, Maryland has allocated $150 million for the area's development and envisions an eventual 20,000 residential population. The developer is Federal Realty Investment Trust, known for other mixed-use developments at nearby Bethesda Row as well as Santana Row in San Jose, California and Assembly Row in Somerville, Massachusetts.

Elements of the complex include:
 Pallas, a 20-story  building, of which the top half is residential and the bottom half is a Canopy by Hilton hotel
 The Henri, another high-rise residential building that has architectural elements mimicking New York City's Puck Building
 909 Rose, a high-rise office building
 915 Meeting Street, a high-rise office building (under construction)
 935 Prose, a high-rise office building (under construction)

The development is named after two of the roads that border it, Rockville Pike and Montrose Parkway. Much of the development is on the former site of Mid-Pike Plaza, a shopping center whose original anchor tenant was an E.J. Korvette discount department store.

References 

Mixed-use developments in the Baltimore-Washington metropolitan area
North Bethesda, Maryland
Ersatz downtowns